McCormick Place  station  is a commuter rail station in Chicago underneath McCormick Place, Chicago's main convention center, that serves the Metra Electric Line north to the Millennium Station and south to University Park, Blue Island, and South Chicago; and the South Shore Line to Gary and South Bend, Indiana.

Structure
The main entrance to the station is from the Grand Concourse in the South Building of McCormick Place. A passageway from the concourse leads to a waiting room, which contains seats and displays showing upcoming arrivals. The platform is accessed from the waiting room via a single staircase and elevator at the north end.

Immediately north of the station, still underneath McCormick Place, the adjacent freight tracks cross over the Metra mainline, switching from running west of the Metra tracks and diverging towards Downtown Chicago to the north of the station to east of and directly adjacent to the Metra tracks for the remainder of the line to University Park.

History

The original station in this vicinity opened in 1868 at 22nd Street, originally consisting of a wooden station building and serving both suburban trains as well as long distance passenger trains. This station served as a temporary terminal for the Illinois Central and Michigan Central railroads after the Great Chicago Fire inflicted significant damage on Great Central Station, rendering it unsuitable as the line's primary terminal. In 1880, the wooden station building was replaced with a brick building. In 1907, long-distance trains ceased stopping there, leaving only suburban trains.

In 1926, the original station at 22nd Street was closed and a new station was opened as its replacement at 23rd Street in conjunction with the Illinois Central Railroad's electrification program.

When McCormick Place was expanded in 1996, the South Building was built over the existing 23rd Street Station, which was then reconfigured to serve the expanded convention center. This reconfiguration was accompanied by replacing an outdated wooden platform with a newer concrete platform.

In 2017, a series of upgrades were performed on the station. These upgrades included mural paintings, digital signage and audio announcements, better lighting, and better signage. Additionally, Metra is investigating the possibility of adding a crossover track to the south of the station to allow more trains to access the platform from the outer tracks.

Service
Select Metra Electric District trains stop at McCormick Place on weekdays, while most trains stop on weekends. All three branches have trains stopping at McCormick Place. As of 2018, McCormick Place is the 179th busiest of Metra's 236 non-downtown stations, with an average of 124 weekday boardings.

The South Shore Line stops at McCormick Place on weekends and for special events only and will not board passengers northbound or discharge passengers southbound.

Bus connections
CTA bus routes
 3 King Drive
 21 Cermak

References

External links 
 

 South Shore Line - Stations

Former Illinois Central Railroad stations
Metra stations in Chicago
South Shore Line stations in Illinois
McCormick Place
Railway stations in the United States opened in 1868
Railway stations in the United States opened in 1996
Railway stations located underground in Illinois
Underground commuter rail